In human anatomy, Bühler's anastamotic artery (also called the arc of Bühler) is an anastomotic shunt joining the superior mesenteric artery and the celiac trunk in vertical orientation. As the aforesaid arteries arise separately from different levels of the abdominal aorta, the shunt provides limited collateral circulation should a blockage occur in the intervening arterial segment. Bühler's artery is a rare phenomenon present in up to 3% of the population, and is thought to be an unobliterated remnant of the ventral longitudinal anastomosis present during embryological development.

References

Arteries
Abdomen